Martina Navratilova was the defending champion and won in the final 6–4, 6–0 against Chris Evert-Lloyd.

Seeds
A champion seed is indicated in bold text while text in italics indicates the round in which that seed was eliminated.

  Martina Navratilova (champion)
  Chris Evert-Lloyd (final)
  Pam Shriver (semifinals)
  Wendy Turnbull (quarterfinals)
  Sylvia Hanika (quarterfinals)
  Hana Mandlíková (quarterfinals)
  Bettina Bunge (semifinals)
  Kathy Rinaldi (first round)

Draw

External links
 1983 Virginia Slims of Dallas Draw

Virginia Slims of Dallas
1983 Virginia Slims World Championship Series